Xian Dong Yan (仙洞巖), also called Fairy cave or Deity's cave, is a natural sea cave in Zhongshan District, Keelung, Taiwan. It is a designated Cultural Landscape by the Bureau of Cultural Heritage in Taiwan. The cave was a shrine and resting place for fishermen during Qing dynasty period and was converted into a Buddhist Temple since Japanese occupation period.

References 

Sea caves
Caves of Taiwan
Landforms of Keelung